Andrew Henderson was a Scottish professional footballer who played in the Scottish League for Falkirk as a goalkeeper.

Personal life 
Henderson served as a private in McCrae's Battalion of the Royal Scots during the First World War. During the course of his service, he was wounded and suffered from phosgene gas poisoning.

Career statistics

References 

Scottish footballers
Royal Scots soldiers
Scottish Football League players
McCrae's Battalion

Place of birth missing
British Army personnel of World War I
Year of birth missing
Year of death missing
Place of death missing
Association football goalkeepers
Falkirk F.C. players